Spotswood Manor is an unincorporated community located within Monroe Township in Middlesex County, New Jersey, United States. The settlement is located just south of the borough of Spotswood, most of them consist of small homes, though businesses and strip malls line Spotswood-Englishtown Road (County Route 613), the main road through the area.

References

Monroe Township, Middlesex County, New Jersey
Unincorporated communities in Middlesex County, New Jersey
Unincorporated communities in New Jersey